Trigonosciadium is a genus in the family Apiaceae. Trigonosciadium brachytaenium is endemic to Iran, whereas T. tuberosum and T. viscidulum grow in Iran, Anatolia and Iraq.

Species
Accepted species in the genus include:

References 

 Muẓaffariyān, Valī Allāh. 1996. Farhang-i nāmhā-yi giyāhān-i Īrān: Lātīnī, Inglīsī, Fārsī. Tihrān: Farhang-i Muʻāṣir.

Apioideae
Taxa named by Pierre Edmond Boissier
Apioideae genera